The 1977 Ice Hockey World Championships took place in Vienna, Austria from 21 April to 8 May. Eight teams took part, first playing each other once, then the four best teams advancing to a new round. The tournament was also the 55th ice hockey European Championship.  Czechoslovakia won for the fifth time, and second in a row, claiming their 14th and final European title as well.

Canada returned after an eight-year absence with a team comprised completely of NHL players from teams that had missed the Stanley Cup playoffs. While being competitive in most games, many people were reportedly upset by the Canadians' conduct on the ice and after the games.  The team refused to listen to the opposing teams' national anthems when they lost, and the coach, Johnny Wilson, explained their multiple misconduct penalties by saying, "We just couldn't compete with the Soviets, and ... it is natural to try to get revenge."

The tournament itself was very close for the medals, with a spectacular last day.  Canada, with a chance still to get a bronze, set a record by defeating the eventual champions eight to two.  Never before had a first place team lost a game that badly. But the Swedes, by beating the Soviets for a second time, saved the Czechoslovaks, and at the same time pushed themselves into second and Canada into fourth.

World Championship Group A (Austria)

First round

Final Round 1–4 place

Consolation round 5–8 place

Romania was relegated to Group B.

World Championship Group B (Japan)
Played in Tokyo 10–21 March.  Played with nine countries because Group A had relegated two nations the previous year to make room for Canada.

East Germany was promoted to Group A, both the Netherlands and Austria were relegated to Group C.

World Championship Group C (Denmark)
Played in Copenhagen and Hørsholm, 12–20 March.  The hosts did not lose a game, outscored their opponents by forty-six, but it was not enough to win.  Only one team was promoted this year so that Group B could return to having eight clubs, and their tie on the last day against Italy left them in second place. Spain made its debut in the World Championships, not having competed since the European Championships of 1926.

Italy was promoted to Group B.

Ranking and statistics

Tournament Awards
Best players selected by the directorate:
Best Goaltender:       Göran Högosta
Best Defenceman:       Valeri Vasiliev
Best Forward:          Helmut Balderis
Media All-Star Team:
Goaltender:  Göran Högosta
Defence:  František Pospíšil,  Valeri Vasiliev
Forwards:  Helmut Balderis,  Vladimír Martinec,  Vladimir Petrov

Final standings
The final standings of the tournament according to IIHF:

European championships final standings
The final standings of the European championships according to IIHF:

Citations

References
Complete results

IIHF Men's World Ice Hockey Championships
World Championships
World Championships
1977
Ice Hockey World Championships
Sports competitions in Vienna
1970s in Vienna
Ice Hockey World Championships
Ice Hockey World Championships
International ice hockey competitions hosted by Japan
Sports competitions in Tokyo
Ice Hockey World Championships
International ice hockey competitions hosted by Denmark
Hørsholm Municipality
International sports competitions in Copenhagen
1970s in Copenhagen
World Championships
World Championships